Rowshanabsar-e Bala (also Romanized as Rowshanābsar-e Bālā; also known as Rowshanābsar) is a village in Reza Mahalleh Rural District, in the Central District of Rudsar County, Gilan Province, Iran. At the 2006 census, its population was 232, in 69 families.

References 

Populated places in Rudsar County